The Girl and the Outlaw is a 1908 American silent short Western film directed by D. W. Griffith for American Mutoscope & Biograph Company. It starred Charles Inslee as the outlaw but other members of the cast are largely unconfirmed. Florence Lawrence and Mack Sennett made early appearances.

Plot
A girl called Nellie falls for Preston, a notorious outlaw who leads a band of Native American renegades. Preston treats her badly and leaves her for dead but she is rescued by a mountain woman whom she had befriended. They escape together, sharing a horse, but Nellie is mortally wounded. As Preston tries to overtake them, the mountain woman stabs him in the chest and he is killed. The renegades stop and then ride away. Nellie dies soon after reaching her father's cabin.

Cast
 Charles Inslee as Bill Preston, the outlaw
 Gene Gauntier as Nellie Carson (unconfirmed)
 Harry Solter as Nellie's father

Others (unconfirmed)
 George Gebhardt
 Arthur V. Johnson
 Florence Lawrence
 Wilfred Lucas
 Mack Sennett
 Dorothy West

References

External links
 

1908 films
1908 Western (genre) films
American silent short films
American black-and-white films
Films directed by D. W. Griffith
Silent American Western (genre) films
1900s American films